Fool's Gold is Canadian singer-songwriter Jill Barber's seventh album, released June 17, 2014.

Track listing

References

2014 albums
Jill Barber albums
Albums recorded at Noble Street Studios